Abd al-Uzza is a theophoric Arabic name that means "servant of al-Uzza", one of the pre-Islamic Arabian divinities.

Given name
Abd al-Uzza ibn Qusai
Abd al-Uzza ibn Abd al-Muttalib 

Patronymic
Qutaylah bint Abd al-Uzza
Siba'a ibn Abd al-Uzza
Barrah bint Abd al-Uzza
Utbah ibn Abd al-Uzza
Utaybah ibn Abd al-Uzza
Asad ibn Abd al-Uzza 
Harla bint Abd al-Uzza

See also
List of Arabic theophoric names
 Abdul

Arabic masculine given names